Quoc Viet Le (born 1982), or Quoc Le, Le Viet Quoc, is a Vietnamese-American computer scientist and a machine learning pioneer at Google Brain, which he established with others from Google. He co-invented doc2vec and seq2seq models in natural language processing. Le also initiated and lead the AutoML initiative at Google Brain, including the proposal of neural architecture search.

Education and career 
Le was born in Hương Thủy in the Thừa Thiên Huế province of Vietnam. He studied at Quốc Học Huế High School. In 2004, Le moved to Australia and attended Australian National University for Bachelor's program, during which he worked under Alex Smola on Kernel method in machine learning. In 2007, Le moved to Stanford University for graduate studies in computer science, where his PhD advisor was Andrew Ng.

In 2011, Le became a cofounder of Google Brain along with his then PhD advisor Andrew Ng and fellow student Jeff Dean and Google researcher Greg Corrado. In 2014, Ilya Sutskever, Oriol Vinyals and Le proposed the seq2seq model for machine translation. In the same year, Tomáš Mikolov and Le proposed the doc2vec model for representation learning of documents.

Honors and awards 
Le was named MIT Technology Review's innovators under 35 in 2014. He has been interviewed by and his research has been reported in major media outlets including Wired, the New York Times, the Atlantic, and the MIT Technology Review.

See also 
 Oriol Vinyals

References 

1982 births
Australian National University alumni
Stanford University alumni
Google people
Machine learning researchers
Vietnamese computer specialists
American computer scientists
People from Thừa Thiên-Huế province

Living people